The NCAA Division II Men's Outdoor Track and Field Championship (known as the NCAA College Division Outdoor Track and Field Championship between 1963 and 1972) is an annual collegiate outdoor track and field competition for men organised by the National Collegiate Athletic Association. Athlete's individual performances earn points for their institution and the team with the most points receives the NCAA team title in track and field.

The reigning champions are Pittsburg State, who won their first national title in 2022.

The most successful program has been Abilene Christian, with nineteen titles. With the Wildcats' departure to Division I, the active program with the most championships is St. Augustine's, with 16.

Events

Track events

 
Sprint events
100 meter dash 
200 meter dash 
400 meter dash 

Distance events
800 meter run
1,500 meter run
3,000 meter steeplechase
5,000 meter run
10,000 meter run

Hurdle Events
110 meter hurdles
400 meter intermediate hurdles

Relay events
400 meter relay
1,600 meter relay

Field events

 
Jumping events
High jump
Pole vault 
Long jump
Triple jump

Throwing events
Shot put
Discus throw
Hammer throw
Javelin throw

Multi-events
Decathlon

Discontinued events

 
Sprint events
100 yard dash 
220 yard dash 
440 yard dash 
880 yard dash 

Distance events
Mile run 
Three-mile run 
Six-mile run 

Hurdle events
120 yard high hurdles 
440 yard intermediate hurdles 

Relay events
440 yard relay 
Mile relay

Summary

Scoring procedures
1963–81: 10 (1st), 8 (2nd), 6 (3rd), 4 (4th), 2 (5th), 1 (6th)
1982–84: 15 (1st), 12 (2nd), 10 (3rd), 9 (4th), 8 (5th), 7 (6th), 6 (7th), 5 (8th), 4 (9th), 3 (10th), 2 (11th), 1 (12th)
1985–present: 10 (1st), 8 (2nd), 6 (3rd), 5 (4th), 4 (5th), 3 (6th), 2 (7th), 1 (8th)

Results

 † Participation vacated by NCAA Committee on Infractions'

Champions

Team titlesList updated through 2022.

Individual titles
Note: Top 10 onlyList updated through 2021.''

 Schools highlight in yellow have reclassified athletics from NCAA Division II.

See also
NCAA Men's Outdoor Track and Field Championship (Division I, Division III)
NCAA Women's Outdoor Track and Field Championship (Division I, Division II, Division III)
NCAA Men's Indoor Track and Field Championship (Division I, Division II, Division III)
NCAA Women's Indoor Track and Field Championships (Division I, Division II, Division III)
NAIA Men's Outdoor Track and Field Championship
Pre-NCAA Outdoor Track and Field Champions

References

External links
NCAA Division II men's outdoor track and field

 NCAA Men's Division II
 Outdoor
Outdoor track, men's
Recurring sporting events established in 1963
1963 establishments in the United States